Buddha's Little Finger is an English-language feature film directed by Tony Pemberton and starring Toby Kebbell. The screenplay is based on Victor Pelevin's 1996 novel Chapayev and Void, which is known in the US as Buddha's Little Finger and in the UK as Clay Machine Gun. The genre of the film has been called drama, psychological romance, arthouse, and thriller. It was released in Germany on September 1, 2015.

Synopsis 

Unemployed Russian poet Pyotr Voyd arrested by KGB during the 1991 Soviet August Coup, by tortures he loses consciousness and appears in 1919 post-revolutionary Russia, where he fights on the same side with the legendary Red cavalry commander Chapaev and his machine-gunner Anka. The strange memory lapses all the time throw him to the bandits' Moscow of nineties, then to the Russian Civil War back and forth, again and again.

Cast 

 Toby Kebbell as Pyotr Voyd
 André Hennicke as Chapaev
 Karine Vanasse as Anna
 Yuki Iwamoto as Mongolian
 Stipe Erceg as Volodin
 Ivan Shvedoff as Shurik
  as Kolyan
 David Scheller as Zherbunov
  as Barbolin
 Anne-Marie Cadieux as Timurovna
 Bernd Michael Lade as Major Smirnov
  as Mrs. Kuznets
 Christoph Bach as Vorblei
  as Kawabata
 Irshad Panjatan as Buddha
 Lilith Stangenberg as Blind Woman
  as Lutze
 Vincent Redetzki as Young Man
  as Shabby Man
 Axel Sichrovsky as Furmanov
  as Pilgrim
 Dominik Paul Weber as Kostrov
 Jerry Gerom as Russian student

Crew

Production

Funding 
In 2006 film was officially selected for the third Berlinale Co-Production Market.
As Mikheil Kalatozishvili early produced the film notes in 2008—2009, the filming start is delayed because of financial difficulties on the side of Western partners. In 2012 Tony Pemberton tells, that when Kalatozishvili died .

Title 

The translation of Pelevin's novel by Andrew Bromfield for UK has name "", and for US — "". According to the translator  he had invented the German name of the book — "", and as "The Clay Machine Gun" was less successful name, Americans had chosen their one. Pemberton's film has the same name.

Screenplay 

As reported in 2011 by "Правда.Ру" screenplay was replenished with dungeons of Lubyanka and cannons firing at White House, though earlier was "planned" style of "incredible cocaine trip" with the respect to the original text.
According to the film producer Karsten Stöter scenario was seriously adapted and interprets text of the original novel quite freely.

Viktor Pelevin, according to the director, have read the script and responded positively, he said that he likes "115 pages out of 120, and with these 5 pages you have managed to almost destroy the whole story", so he wrote a number of his comments how to fix.

Shooting 

Filming had planned to produce in Leipzig and Berlin.
According to the director, he had to reduce the number of filming to 30 days, although earlier there were planned a 40-days filming, finally, because of the budget deficit - 21.

In accordance to the data of "filmportal.de" shooting have been conducted August 28, 2012—September 25, 2012.

Cast 
Western actors play the starring roles of the film, so as planned initially, the French actor Jean-Marc Barr  should play the role of Volodin, British actor Rupert Friend will play the role of Pyotr Voyd, and Sophia Myles as Anna.
According to Mikheil Kalatozishvili, to make the film truthful — the Russian actors must be at least in the crew of the film, and western stars is a kind of "duck call" for the public from overseas.

Release 
The dates of release and filming were repeatedly postponed, so according to the IMDb release was scheduled for 2009. 
In August 2012, one of the film producers, Martin Paul-Hus, pointed out that the film will be ready by September 2013, same time in December 2012 the director hoped to release film in the spring of 2013.

As tells film director Tony Pemberton, he spent 10 years to make this film.

Premiere 
The premiere of "Buddha's Little Finger" took place on August 6, 2015 in Leipzig.

See also 
 Dreams (1993 film)

References

Further reading

External links 
 
 
 
 
 Buddha's Little Finger at "Filmz.ru" 

 Buddha's Little Finger at Rohfilm  
  
  
 Buddha's Little Finger on social network "VKontakte" 

Films shot in Germany
German drama films
2015 thriller drama films
English-language German films
2010s science fiction films
Films based on science fiction novels
Films based on Russian novels
Films set in Russia
Russian Revolution films
Russian Civil War films
Films about dreams
Films about parallel universes
Films set in 1919
Films set in the 1910s
Films set in 1991
Films set in the 1990s
Films set in psychiatric hospitals
1990s in Russian cinema
2015 drama films
2015 films
2010s English-language films
2010s German films